Auriac is a commune in the Aude department in the Occitanie region of southern France.

The inhabitants of the commune are known as Auriacois or Auriacoises.

Geography

The commune is located in the Corbières Massif some 35 km south-east of Limoux and 15 km east of Arques. Access to the commune is by the D212 road which branches from the D613 west of Mouthoumet and goes south through the commune by a tortuous route then continues south to join the D10 north-east of Soulatgé. Apart from the village there are the hamlets of Savugnan in the south-west and La Grave north of the village. The whole of the commune is rugged and heavily forested.

Many streams rise all over the commune and flow northwards to join the Orbieu which flows through the commune from south-west to north to eventually join the Aude near Raissac-d'Aude.

Neighbouring communes and villages

Heraldry

Administration

List of Successive Mayors

Demography
In 2017 the commune had 43 inhabitants.

Culture and heritage

Civil heritage
The commune has one building that is registered as an historical monument:
The Ruins of a Chateau (11th century)

Religious heritage
The commune has one religious building that is registered as an historical monument:
The Chapel of Saint-André (12th century) The Church contains one item that is registered as an historical object:
A Cope and Chasuble (18th century)

See also
Communes of the Aude department

References

External links
Auriac on Géoportail, National Geographic Institute (IGN) website 
Auriac on the 1750 Cassini Map

Communes of Aude